The Hi-Point carbine is a series of pistol-caliber carbines manufactured by Hi-Point Firearms chambered, for 9×19mm Parabellum, .40 S&W, 10mm Auto, .45 ACP and .380 ACP handgun cartridges. They are inexpensive as they are constructed using polymers and alloyed metals resulting in a reduction of production costs and sale price. It functions via a simple direct blowback action.

Origin
Developed during the now-defunct 1994 Federal assault weapons ban, the Hi-Point carbine comes with a ten-round magazine that fits into the pistol grip. With the expiration of the federal assault weapons ban in 2004, aftermarket third-party 15- and 20-round magazines were created.

The proprietary magazines are usable only with Hi-Point firearms. The pistol-style magazines for the 4095 .40 S&W carbine are fully interchangeable with the Hi-Point .40 S&W pistol. No such compatibility was advertised by Hi-Point regarding the original 995 carbine and the 9mm Hi-Point C-9 pistol; owners of both designs have reported that they are not completely interchangeable. The 8 shot pistol magazine is too short to fit the carbine; however, the 10 shot carbine magazine will fit into the pistol but extends past the bottom of the grip.

Development
In the first quarter of 2009, a new model of the 995 carbine was released, the 995TS, which features a new stock and last round hold open.  The TS model is slightly more expensive than the "995 Classic," affectionately known as "the Planet of the Apes gun." The 4095 model in .40 S&W and the newest model, the Model 4595 in .45 ACP, are available only in the new TS configuration. As of September 2010, the "995 Classic" or "4095 Classic" are no longer featured on the Hi-Point website.

As of November 2017, Hi-Point has put into production a new carbine in 10mm Auto. Based on the Model 4595TS, the Model 1095TS functions similarly to the 4595TS, with a 10 round single-stack magazine and a telescoping bolt in a blowback action.

The Hipoint carbines have a variety of aftermarket accessories. Hipoint manufactures a muzzle brake and laser system for the first generation models. Various companies manufacture accessories and attachments for the second generation of 995. The 995TS features picatinny rails and an improved design allowing for more versatility and modularity compared to the first generation 995.

Legality
The Hi Point Carbine has since been designated an assault weapon in the State of Connecticut with the April 4, 2013 signing of Public Act 13-3. It has been similarly designated by the State of New York with the signing of the NY SAFE Act and as of  mid-2013, purchase of any of the unaltered carbines has been restricted to law enforcement officers. However, in 2014 a company developed a shield that prevents the firearm operator from wrapping his or her hand around the pistol grip, which means that legally the pistol grip is not a pistol grip within the definition of such under the SAFE Act. With the shield fitted, Hi-Point carbines are again legal to own in New York state.

In 2022, H.R.1808 explicitly mentions "Hi-Point carbine" in Sec2.a.40.H.xii, as a "semiautomatic assault weapon", and subject to the restrictions of the resolution.

Popularity

The carbine was listed as the 7th most popular pistol caliber carbine in 2019. Some 28,000 were made and sold in 1998 alone, and it continues to sell well. After the success of the 9mm Model 995, the Model 4095 was created in the .40 S&W caliber. It shares much of the success of the Model 995.  The Model 4595TS is a success and shares the popularity of the smaller-caliber versions.

Hi-Point carbines consistently score high in evaluations run by Gun Tests Magazine.

The Hi-Point Carbine is infamous for being used in the Columbine High School massacre, as Eric Harris used the weapon throughout the massacre. The first shots were fired with the Hi-Point Carbine.

See also
 Hi-Point Firearms
 Hi-Point CF-380
 Hi-Point C-9 and C-9 Comp
 Hi-Point Model 40SW
 Hi-Point Model JHP

References

External links
 
 
 
 

Semi-automatic rifles of the United States
.40 S&W firearms
Carbines